RT Aurigae (RT Aur, 48 Aurigae) is a yellow supergiant variable star in the constellation Auriga, about 1,500 light years from Earth.

RT Aurigae is an F to G type Classical Cepheid variable which varies from magnitude +5.00 to +5.82 with a period of 3.728309 days.  The variability was discovered in 1905.  It was quickly recognised as a member of the class of Cepheid variables, but their nature was not understood at that time.  Radial velocity changes were detected corresponding to the brightness variations, but the idea that these were caused by stellar pulsations and temperature changes was largely dismissed in favour of orbital motions of a binary star.  More accurate observations eventually proved beyond doubt that the brightness variations were caused by pulsations in the atmospheres of the stars, with the stars being smallest and hottest near maximum brightness.

RT Aurigae has been suspected to be a spectroscopic binary system, but this has not been confirmed.  The strongest evidence was found in 2013 using CHARA array optical interferometry.  The companion would be 6.7 magnitudes fainter than the supergiant primary, cooler and fainter than an F0 main sequence star. The two stars are separated by 2.1 milli-arc seconds.

References

Aurigae, 48
045412
030827
Auriga (constellation)
Classical Cepheid variables
F-type supergiants
Aurigae, RT
2332
BD+30 1238
G-type supergiants